William Joseph Barr (born 21 January 1969) is an English former footballer and manager, and is currently the assistant manager of Scottish Championship side Dundee. He took up the post of caretaker manager at Wrexham after the departure of Andy Morrell as manager, but failed to secure the position permanently. He also served as assistant manager at Salford City.

Playing career

Barr started his career with Halifax Town in July 1987, after coming through the club's youth team. He joined Crewe Alexandra in June 1994. He then moved to Carlisle United in August 1997.

Coaching career
He was caretaker manager of Carlisle United from April to August 2002. He later took up a new coaching role with the first team squad at Preston North End, holding the position of first team coach from the summer of 2006.

He left the club in January 2010 following the appointment of Darren Ferguson as  manager. He then joined Alan Irvine at Sheffield Wednesday assuming the role of first team coach.

Wrexham
In September 2011, Barr joined Wrexham following the appointment of player/manager Andy Morrell. A management team of Morrell, Barr and Michael Oakes took Wrexham to second in the league in the 2011–12 season, finishing on a record 98 points for a second place team. They went on to lose in the play-offs to Luton Town. The following year they took Wrexham to Wembley for the first time in their history, winning the FA Trophy, beating Grimsby Town on penalties. A month and a half later they returned to Wembley, but lost 2–0 to Newport County in the play-off Final.

The following season was a disappointment as Wrexham lost numerous games at the beginning of the season, including 2–0 at home to local rivals Chester. This led the fans to have a lack of belief in manager Andy Morrell, and after a 1–0 home loss to Barnet he resigned, leaving Barr as caretaker manager. Barr confirmed he had applied for the job although lost his first game 5–0 to Luton. Barr left Wrexham with immediate effect on 19 March 2014 after failing to get the managerial job on a permanent basis

Blackburn Rovers
In August 2019 Barr was appointed head coach for Blackburn Rovers under 23s.

Salford City
In August 2021 he left Blackburn, joining Salford City as Assistant Manager.

On the 17 May 2022, Barr was sacked along with Gary Bowyer by Salford City.

Dundee 
On 8 June 2022, Bowyer and Barr joined Scottish Championship side Dundee, with Barr in the role of assistant manager to Bowyer.

References

Billy Barr's managerial career

External links

1969 births
Living people
Association football fullbacks
Blackburn Rovers F.C. non-playing staff
Carlisle United F.C. managers
Carlisle United F.C. players
Crewe Alexandra F.C. players
English Football League managers
English Football League players
English football managers
English footballers
Footballers from Halifax, West Yorkshire
Gretna F.C. players
Halifax Town A.F.C. players
Preston North End F.C. non-playing staff
Salford City F.C. non-playing staff
Scottish Football League players
Sheffield Wednesday F.C. non-playing staff
Workington A.F.C. players
Dundee F.C. non-playing staff